Sande is a village in Farsund municipality in Agder county, Norway. The village was the administrative centre of the old municipality of Herad which existed from 1838 until its dissolution in 1965. Herad Church is located in the village.

References

Villages in Agder
Farsund